Natalya Torshina-Alimzhanova (born 4 October 1968 in Kemerovo, Russian SFSR) is a Kazakhstani athlete who specializes in the 400 metres hurdles. Her personal best time is 54.50 seconds, achieved in May 2000 in Vila Real de Santo António. She competed at three Olympic Games.

Competition record

In addition she has four gold medals from the Central Asian Games.

References

External links
 

1968 births
Living people
Sportspeople from Kemerovo
Russian female hurdlers
Kazakhstani female hurdlers
Olympic athletes of Kazakhstan
Athletes (track and field) at the 1996 Summer Olympics
Athletes (track and field) at the 2000 Summer Olympics
Athletes (track and field) at the 2004 Summer Olympics
Asian Games gold medalists for Kazakhstan
Asian Games silver medalists for Kazakhstan
Asian Games bronze medalists for Kazakhstan
Asian Games medalists in athletics (track and field)
Athletes (track and field) at the 1994 Asian Games
Athletes (track and field) at the 1998 Asian Games
Athletes (track and field) at the 2002 Asian Games
World Athletics Championships athletes for Kazakhstan
Medalists at the 1994 Asian Games
Medalists at the 1998 Asian Games
Medalists at the 2002 Asian Games
Competitors at the 1994 Goodwill Games
Kazakhstani people of Russian descent